The 2016 World Running Target Championships was held from 14 until 23 July, 2016 in Suhl, Germany. 24 events were held.

Medal count

Men

Men's medal match

Junior Men's medal match

Women

Women's medal match

Junior Women's medal match

Competition schedule

References
Official schedule
Results

World Running Target Championships
ISSF
Shooting
2016 in German sport
Sport in Thuringia
Shooting competitions in Germany
Suhl